The 1990–91 West Midlands (Regional) League season was the 91st in the history of the West Midlands (Regional) League, an English association football competition for semi-professional and amateur teams based in the West Midlands county, Shropshire, Herefordshire, Worcestershire and southern Staffordshire.

Premier Division

The Premier Division featured 19 clubs which competed in the division last season, along with three new clubs:
Darlaston, promoted from Division One
Ilkeston Town, joined from the Central Midlands League
Pelsall Villa, promoted from Division One

Also, Millfields changed name to West Bromwich Town.

League table

References

External links

1990–91
8